(+)-camphene synthase (EC 4.2.3.116) is an enzyme with systematic name geranyl-diphosphate diphosphate-lyase [cyclizing, (+)-camphene-forming]. This enzyme catalyses the following chemical reaction

 geranyl diphosphate  (+)-camphene + diphosphate

Cyclase I of Salvia officinalis (sage) gives about equal parts (+)-camphene and (+)-alpha-pinene.

References

External links 
 

EC 4.2.3